Tower of Deskford was a 14th-century tower house, about  south of Cullen, Moray, Scotland at Deskford, west of the burn. The tower and its associated buildings are a Scheduled Ancient Monument.

It may be known alternatively as Deskford Castle or Kirkton of Deskford.

History
The Sinclairs of Findlater and Deskford built the castle in the late 14th century, but it passed to the Ogilvies, by marriage after the death of Sir John Sinclair at the Battle of Harlaw.  The Ogilvies later left the castle for Cullen House.

The precise relationship and history between the tower and the remains of the nearby Church of St John in Deskford is unknown. The chapel of St John is recorded as having been rebuilt in 1541 and it was described as a church four years later. When a new parish church was built in 1872, the original building was unroofed and its walls were consolidated with cement. The tower appears to have been attached to the north wall of the church at one time, but the connection has been severed, probably when the church was unroofed.

Structure
In the 1790s the tower stood three storeys tall with a garret, but little remains apart from outhouses. Most was demolished in the 1830s. In the late 18th century, there was evidence suggesting that the castle had a courtyard.

See also
Castles in Great Britain and Ireland
List of castles in Scotland

References	

Castles in Moray